Salome may refer to several works by Titian and his studio, including:
Salome (Titian, Rome), 
Salome (Titian, Madrid), 
Salome (Titian, private collection),

See also 

 Judith with the Head of Holofernes (Titian)